CITIC Tower is a 33-storey office building on Tim Mei Avenue, Admiralty, Hong Kong. It is the corporate headquarters of CITIC Pacific Ltd, a conglomerate publicly traded on the Hong Kong Stock Exchange and listed on the Hang Seng Index, and also a subsidiary of the CITIC Group.

CITIC Tower is also the headquarters of another development partner, Kerry Group.

It is one of the participants in the nightly A Symphony of Lights (幻彩詠香江) light show on both sides of Victoria Harbour.

In an authorised protest in 2019, police surrounded the tower on both sides, trapping protesters and fired tear gas into the crowd of protesters. International experts called the use of tear gas excessive, "actually inciting and causing what looks like a stampede".

Design and construction 

The tower was conceived as an equilateral triangular block with landscaped sky gardens at various levels. The architecture was designed by P&T Group. Its unique design is composed of equilateral triangles and circles.

CITIC Tower was completed in 1997 under a fast track development programme.

Location and facilities 
It borders the Tamar site in Admiralty and features a view of Victoria Harbour. At the lower levels there is a shopping mall and carpark. There is a footbridge connecting it with Admiralty Centre and MTR Admiralty station.

Of the proposed government headquarters to be built at Tamar site, two of the taller buildings will be of similar height to CITIC Tower.

Current tenants
Maybank (7/F,18/F)
CITIC Pacific Ltd (29/F-32/F)
CITIC Capital (27/F-28/F)
CITIC Securities International (8/F,11/F & 26/F)
Kaplan (6/F)
Mizuho Bank
Shangri-La International Hotel Management Ltd (2/F)

References

External links 

 CITIC Tower homepage
 CITIC Group homepage
 CITIC Pacific homepage
 CITIC Tower CITIC Pacific page on CITIC Tower
 Chinese article on CITIC Tower's unique geometrical appearance
 Emporis page on CITIC Tower

Admiralty, Hong Kong
CITIC Group
Office buildings in Hong Kong
Shangri-La Hotels and Resorts
1997 establishments in Hong Kong
Office buildings completed in 1997